is a Japanese athlete. He competed in the men's high jump at the 1976 Summer Olympics.

References

1953 births
Living people
Athletes (track and field) at the 1976 Summer Olympics
Japanese male high jumpers
Olympic athletes of Japan
Place of birth missing (living people)
20th-century Japanese people